Ayrancı is a town and district of Karaman Province in the Central Anatolia region of Turkey.

Ayrancı may also refer to:

 Sinan Ayrancı (born 1990), Turkish-Swedish footballer
 Ayrancı Dam, dam in Buğdaylı, Turkey, built between 1956 and 1958
 Ayrancı, Beşiri, a village in the district of Beşiri, Batman Province, Turkey
 Ayrancı, Suluova, a village in the district of Suluova, Amasya Province, Turkey

Turkish-language surnames